Warm Springs is a former town in the Tonopah Basin in Nye County, Nevada, near the mountain pass which divides the Kawich and Hot Creek ranges (at ). It is located at the junction of U.S. Route 6 and State Route 375 (the "Extraterrestrial Highway"), around 50 miles east of Tonopah. Only two abandoned buildings remain.

History

The first white settlement in Warm Springs was in 1866, when it served as a stopover for stagecoaches and other travellers.
The post office was in operation from January 1924 through June 1929.
In 1947, the springs was purchased by the Fallini brothers and it was reported that Thomas Hurt had been operating the springs for several years.
Never more than a tiny settlement, Warm Springs' population dwindled until it became a ghost town. All that remained was a single streetlight, a telephone box, and several huts built over pools filled by the warm springs that give the town its name.

References

External links

 Warm Springs ghost town info
 Photos of Warm Springs in 1994
 Warm Springs Video Nov 2006

Unincorporated communities in Nevada
Unincorporated communities in Nye County, Nevada
Populated places established in 1866
Ghost towns in Nevada
1866 establishments in Nevada